is a Japanese professional footballer who plays as a forward for Yokohama FC. He represented Japan's under-20 team at the 2006 AFC Youth Championship.

Career
In August 2006, Ito received a trial from English club Arsenal, where he impressed manager Arsène Wenger. However, his work permit application fell through, and in January 2007, he signed a three-and-a-half-year contract with French club Grenoble.

Career statistics

Club

International

Appearances in major competitions

References

External links
Profile at Yokohama F. Marinos 
Grenoble Foot 38 official site (French)
Grenoble Foot 38 official site  (Japan)

FrenchFootball.com player statistics

1988 births
Living people
Association football people from Aichi Prefecture
Japanese footballers
Association football forwards
Japan youth international footballers
Ligue 1 players
Ligue 2 players
J1 League players
J2 League players
Grenoble Foot 38 players
Shimizu S-Pulse players
Yokohama F. Marinos players
Kashima Antlers players
Yokohama FC players
Matsumoto Yamaga FC players
Japanese expatriate footballers
Japanese expatriate sportspeople in France
Expatriate footballers in France